The following is a list of teams and cyclists that will take part in the 2019 Vuelta a España.

Teams

The 18 UCI WorldTeams are automatically invited to the race. In addition, four Procontinental teams obtained a wildcard, bringing the number of teams to 22.

The teams entering the race will be:

UCI WorldTeams

 
 
 
 
 
 
 
 
 
 
 
 
 
 
 
 
 
 

UCI Professional Continental teams

Cyclists

By starting number

By team

By nationality 
The 176 riders that are competing in the 2019 Vuelta a España originated from 30 different countries.

 As the first stage was a team time trial, the winning team is not included in the list of stage winners

References

2019 Vuelta a España